The year 1828 in architecture involved some significant events.

Buildings

Openings
 July 17 – Stone Kingston Bridge, London, designed by Edward Lapidge.
 October 25 – St Katharine Docks in London, designed by Philip Hardwick.

Completions
 St Stephen's Church, Edinburgh, designed by William Henry Playfair.
 St John on Bethnal Green, London, designed by John Soane.
 Second Christiansborg Palace, Copenhagen, Denmark.
 Flagstaff Tower, Delhi, India.
 Jašiūnai Manor, Lithuania, designed by Karol Podczaszyński.

 Raczyński Library, Poznań, Poland.
 Kremlin Arsenal, Moscow, Russia.
 Pont de l'Archevêché, Paris, France.
 Chaudière Bridge, Ottawa, Canada, designed by Colonel John By.
 Kings Bridge, Dublin, Ireland, designed by George Papworth.
 Western Pavilion, Brighton, UK, designed by Amon Henry Wilds.
 Westminster Arcade in Providence, Rhode Island, USA, built by Russell Warren and James Bucklin.

Events
 Heinrich Hübsch's In welchem Style sollen wir bauen? ("In which style should we build?") is published.
 Completion of restoration work on Touro Synagogue in Newport, Rhode Island, an early example of building restoration in the United States.

Births
 June 9 – George Goldie, English church architect (died 1887)
 June 15 – Thomas Newenham Deane, Irish architect (died 1899)

Deaths
 March 12 – William Stretton, English architect, 72
 March 28 – William Thornton, British-American physician, inventor, painter and architect, 68

References

Architecture
Years in architecture
19th-century architecture